Nouan-le-Fuzelier is a commune in the Loir-et-Cher department of central France. Nouan-le-Fuzelier station has rail connections to Orléans and Vierzon.

Population

See also
Communes of the Loir-et-Cher department

References

Communes of Loir-et-Cher
Carnutes